The COVID-19 pandemic in Kuwait is part of the worldwide pandemic of coronavirus disease 2019 caused by severe acute respiratory syndrome coronavirus 2. The first confirmed case in Kuwait was announced on 24 February 2020.

Kuwait ended the full curfew on 30 May 2020 and started taking steps towards a gradual return to normal life by placing a partial curfew from 6 pm until 6 am. This step is a first of five with each phase tentatively lasting for 3 weeks which could vary depending on the assessment by the Ministry of Health. Initially, the country started with a voluntary stay at home approach since midnight of 11 March, with the government suspending work across all government sectors except emergency services. All commercial air travel and border travel were suspended since midnight of 14 March 2020 (start of 15 March 2020). Partial curfew was implemented since 22 March 2020 where curfew hours were between 5 pm until 4 am. This was amended on 6 April, where end of curfew hours were extended from 4 am to 6 am. With the start of the holy month of Ramadan on 24 April 2020, the partial curfew was further amended to 4 pm until 8 am with special permissions for deliveries from 5 pm until 1 am (under strict health code conditions). On 10 May, the country was placed under full curfew based on the assessment of the Ministry of Health, until 31 May 2020. Then again, a curfew of one month was imposed from 5 p.m. until 5 a.m. starting 7 March 2021 until 8 April 2021, after 1,716 new coronavirus cases were recorded on 4 March 2021.

Background 
On 12 January 2020, the World Health Organization (WHO) confirmed that a novel coronavirus was the cause of a respiratory illness in a cluster of people in Wuhan City, Hubei Province, China, which was reported to the WHO on 31 December 2019.

The case fatality ratio for COVID-19 has been much lower than SARS of 2003, but the transmission has been significantly greater, with a significant total death toll.

Timeline

February 2020 
On 24 February, Kuwaiti Ministry of Health announced that there were 3 cases detected coming from Iran that carry coronavirus disease 2019. The first person was a Kuwait I national, 53 years old, while the second was a Saudi national, 61 years old, and the third was a person from the stateless community.
Later, 2 cases were announced on that same day.
At the end of 24 February, there were 5 confirmed cases in Kuwait.

On 25 February, Kuwaiti Ministry of Health announced that there were 4 new cases coming from Iran with coronavirus disease 2019.
At the end of 25 February, there were 9 confirmed cases in Kuwait.

On 26 February, Kuwaiti Ministry of Health announced that 16 news cases have been reported with the novel coronavirus, associated with travel to Iran.
At the end of 26 February, there were 25 confirmed cases in Kuwait.

On 27 February, Kuwaiti Ministry of Health announced new 18 cases associated with travel to Iran.
At the end of 27 February, there were 43 confirmed cases in Kuwait.

On 28 February, Kuwaiti Ministry of Health announced new 2 cases associated with travel to Iran.
At the end of 28 February, there were 45 confirmed cases in Kuwait.

On 29 February, the Kuwaiti Ministry of Health announced that there were no new cases.
At the end of February, there were 45 confirmed cases in Kuwait.

March 2020 
On 11 March, Kuwaiti Directorate General of Civil Aviation has suspended all travel, except cargo flights, to and from Kuwait starting from 13 March, effectively locking down the nation until further notice.

On 12 March, Kuwaiti Ministry of Health announced 8 new cases, bringing the total number of confirmed cases to 80.

On 13 March, the Kuwaiti Ministry of Health announced 20 new cases, bringing the total number of confirmed cases to 100. The Public Authority Of Agriculture Affairs And Fish Resources closed public parks, and the ministry of Awqaf and Islamic Affairs announced just before noon prayers for Muslims to pray from home and not to attend Friday prayers during a pandemic.

Statistics

Confirmed new cases per day

Confirmed deaths per day

Action taken on the deceased 

April 16: The Director of Funeral Affairs Department of Kuwait Municipality, revealed that the administration had buried three bodies who had died due to the Coronavirus, without washing them. Ministry of Health has issued direct orders that in the event of death due to the virus, the deceased is placed in a completely closed sterile bag which does not open. The burial procedures are as per usual proceeding and the selection of graves is according to the established numerical sequence, and therefore there are no places designated for those who died with the virus. In addition, only three people with the deceased were allowed to enter and attend the burial which takes place in the cemetery. Kuwaiti MP Khalīl aṣ-Ṣaliḥ suggested that medical workers who die fighting the pandemic be treated as martyrs, under the martyrs' office, which controls the affairs of families of people who died fighting off the Iraqi invasion of Kuwait.

Response 

All commercial flights were suspended on 13 March, with an exception for cargo flights. A public holiday was declared from 12 to 26 March, with work to resume on 29 March. Some shops were closed, and restrictions were placed on restaurants. Authorities asked people to stay home for Friday prayers, saying "The doors of the mosques will stay closed" and citing a fatwa allowing people not to attend prayers in mosques. Classes were suspended from 1 to 12 March, which was extended to 29 March, and later to 4 August.

Visas were partially suspended, and quarantines required for all arrivals from certain high-risk countries. Arrivals at Kuwait International Airport from other countries were required to self-quarantine for 14 days. The borders with Iraq and Saudi Arabia were closed.

Food exports were banned, and Minister of Commerce & Industry Khalid Al Roudan reassured people that the country had enough food and shipping was continuing.

On 15 March, Interior Minister Anas Khalid Al-Saleh told people to follow the measures imposed by the government and stop going out unnecessarily. He warned that curfews or deportations could be used if people failed to comply.

On 1 April 2021, Kuwait has extended the curfew until 22 April from 7 p.m. to 5 a.m.

Impacts

Academic Studies 

The suspension of the schools was needed to avoid the spread of the coronavirus in children, teenagers and younger people (Kindergarten up to university level). The high school graduates (Grade 12 seniors) were the most affected by the suspension since graduation is usually in May–June yearly. The academic year will be resumed in September 2021.

Economics 

The strategic planning and surplus for food and supplies are for six months. All supermarkets and grocery stores have all usual products as before the border closure or the imposed partial curfew.

However, small businesses are the most affected since they are losing a lot of money, and yet, have to pay rent or salaries to their workers. The government have promised packages and solutions to ensure these businesses are compensated for these unfortunate circumstances with the partial lockdown.

People 

People are confined to their homes. However, there is a tendency to rush to buy supplies in non-curfew hours (6 a.m. to 5 p.m.), even though the Kuwaiti government have reiterated that goods and supplies should last six months.

The partial lockdown, staying at home and physical distancing has led to theaters, malls, department stores, and entertainment venues to be closed. Gyms and restaurants are also closed due to the coronavirus.

Due to raising cases and to help curb the spread of the pandemic coronavirus Kuwait has total full-time curfew from 4 p.m. on Sunday 10 May 2020 until 30 May 2020 . Above all of that, the ministry has provided people with  website links to book an appointment so they can go out to supermarket buy their needs or for the hospital.

Medical personnel 
At least 105 medical personnel, including doctors, nurses, pharmacists, and other professions, were infected with the virus as of 27 April 2020.

References

External links 
 
 Coronavirus COVID-19 Global Cases and historical data by Johns Hopkins University

 
Kuwait
Disease outbreaks in Kuwait
2020 in Kuwait
2021 in Kuwait
Kuwait
2020 disasters in Kuwait
2021 disasters in Kuwait